Adán Augusto López Hernández (born 24 September 1963) is a Mexican politician affiliated with Morena. López Hernández served as the governor of Tabasco from 1 January 2019 to 26 August 2021, when he replaced Olga Sánchez Cordero as Secretary of the Interior.

Life
López Hernández was born in Paraíso, Tabasco, earning a law degree from the Universidad Juárez Autónoma de Tabasco in 1984. He worked as a lawyer and notary in the 1980s and 1990s, earning a master's degree from Paris II in 1987. He also served in Tabasco state government during the 1990s, briefly as the head of the Local Board of Conciliation and Arbitration and then as the deputy secretary of Government and Legal Matters. Through 2003, he was a member of the Institutional Revolutionary Party, which included a stint as the state party's secretary general. He served as the campaign coordinator for Manuel Andrade Díaz's 2000 gubernatorial bid; after the elections were annulled by the TEPJF, he positioned himself as a candidate to be the interim governor in the ensuing August 2001 elections, then stepped aside to help the party choose a candidate, who turned out to be Díaz.

As a PRD member
In 2003, López Hernández switched parties from the PRI to the Party of the Democratic Revolution (PRD), and it was under this banner that he was elected to the state and federal legislatures. He served in the Tabasco state congress from 2007 to 2009, where he was the PRD group leader, and then was elected to the Chamber of Deputies for the LXI Legislature. In San Lázaro, he sat on five commissions, including secretary posts on two: Strengthening of Federalism and Special for the Grijalva-Usumacinta River Valleys. After his term as a deputy, voters in Tabasco elected López Hernández to the Senate for the LXII and LXIII Legislatures. Within months of taking office, on January 23, 2013, he left the PRD and initially became an independent. Shortly into the second half of his term, on October 10, 2015, López Hernández resigned from his seat, being replaced by Carlos Manuel Merino Campos, and made the second party switch of his career as he sought to become the head of Morena in Tabasco, a post he would win and hold until resigning to run for governor in late 2017.

Tabasco gubernatorial campaign
In February 2018, López Hernández became the only gubernatorial candidate for Morena and its Juntos Haremos Historia coalition in the 2018 Tabasco state elections after the other candidate dropped out and endorsed him. Competing in the home state of Morena's presidential candidate Andrés Manuel López Obrador, polling through the race showed him with a wide advantage. The candidacy also attracted some concern from members of Morena, who accused him of falsifying documents in real estate transactions as a notary, which allegedly benefitted his family.

Exit polling on election night gave López Hernández between 61.7 and 69.7 percent of the vote, with a lead of some 40 percentage points over Gerardo Gaudiano, the PRD candidate.

References

1963 births
Living people
Members of the Senate of the Republic (Mexico)
Members of the Chamber of Deputies (Mexico)
Morena (political party) politicians
21st-century Mexican politicians
Governors of Tabasco
Politicians from Tabasco
People from Paraíso, Tabasco
Universidad Juárez Autónoma de Tabasco alumni
Paris 2 Panthéon-Assas University alumni
20th-century Mexican lawyers
Cabinet of Andrés Manuel López Obrador